Şümrüd (also, Shimri and Shumrud) is a village and municipality in the Astara Rayon of Azerbaijan.  It has a population of 729.

References 

Populated places in Astara District